SIPO or Sipo can refer to:


Government organizations
 Sicherheitspolizei, often abbreviated SiPo, the Security Police of Nazi Germany
 Estonian Security Police and SD, Sipo, a security police force created by the Germans in 1942 in occupied Estonia
 Standards in Public Office Commission, Ireland
 State Intellectual Property Office, the former name of patent office of the People's Republic of China, now known as the Chinese National Intellectual Property Administration
 State Intellectual Property Office (Croatia), the patent office of Croatia

Species
 South Island oystercatcher or South Island pied oystercatcher, a bird species in New Zealand
 Sipo, some snakes of the genus Chironius
 Entandrophragma utile or Sipo, an African tree species - see Entandrophragma

Other uses
 Serial In Parallel Out (SIPO) block
 of a Serializer/Deserializer (SerDes)  in high speed communications.
 of a Shift register
 Sipo (footballer) (born 1988), Equatoguinean footballer

See also
 Sipos (disambiguation)
 Sipoo, a municipality in Finland